Longitudes and Attitudes: Exploring the World After September 11 (reprinted as Longitudes and Attitudes: The World in the Age of Terrorism in 2003) is the third book by New York Times columnist Thomas Friedman.  Firstly published in September 2002, it consists of articles relating to 9/11 and a brief journal of Friedman's experience around that time.

References

Books about the September 11 attacks
2002 non-fiction books